In situ thermal desorption (ISTD) is an intensive thermally enhanced environmental remediation technology that uses thermal conductive heating (TCH) elements to directly transfer heat to environmental media. The ISTD/TCH process can be applied at low (<100 °C), moderate (~100 °C) and higher (>100 °C) temperature levels to accomplish the remediation of a wide variety of contaminants, both above and below the water table. ISTD/TCH is the only major in situ thermal remediation (ISTR) technology capable of achieving subsurface target treatment temperatures above the boiling point of water and is effective at virtually any depth in almost any media. TCH works in tight soils, clay layers, and soils with wide heterogeneity in permeability or moisture content that are impacted by a broad range of volatile and semi-volatile organic contaminants.

History 
ISTD using TCH was developed by Shell Oil Co. in the late 1980s and grew out of research and development for enhanced oil recovery. During the mid-1990s Shell Oil Company commercialized ISTD with an investment of over $30 million.

Method of operation 
Thermal conductive heating is the application of heat to subsurface soils through conductive heat transfer.  The source of the heat is applied via electric or gas powered thermal wells.  Thermal wells are inserted vertically, or horizontally, in an array within the soil.  Heat flows from the heating elements by conduction.  The heating process causes contaminants to be vaporized or destroyed by means of:
 evaporation
 steam stripping
 hydrolysis
 oxidation
 pyrolysis

Vaporized contaminants are collected from vapor extraction wells and containerized for removal or recycling.

See also
 Soil vapor extraction
 thermal blanket

References

Pollution control technologies
Soil contamination
Waste treatment technology